Bouchercon is an annual convention of creators and devotees of mystery and detective fiction. It is named in honour of writer, reviewer, and editor Anthony Boucher; also the inspiration for the Anthony Awards, which have been issued at the convention since 1986. This page details Bouchercon XXV and the 9th Anthony Awards ceremony.

Bouchercon
The convention was held in Seattle, Washington from October 6 to 9, 1994. The event was chaired by photographer Thom Walls.

Special Guests
Lifetime Achievement award — Tony Hillerman
Guest of Honor — Marcia Muller
Fan guest of Honor — Art Scott
Toastmaster — George C. Chesbro

Anthony Awards
The following list details the awards distributed at the ninth annual Anthony Awards ceremony.

Novel award
Winner:
Marcia Muller, Wolf in the Shadows

Shortlist:
Michael Connelly, The Black Ice
Earl Emerson, Morons and Madmen
Joan Hess, O Little Town of Maggody
Tony Hillerman, Sacred Clowns
Janet LaPierre, Old Enemies
Margaret Maron, Southern Discomfort
Kathy Hogan Trocheck, To Live and Die in Dixie
Minette Walters, The Sculptress
Charlene Weir, Consider the Crows

First novel award
Winner:
Nevada Barr, Track of the Cat

Shortlist:
Jan Burke, Goodnight, Irene
Laurie R. King, A Grave Talent
Sharan Newman, Death Comes as Epiphany
Abigail Padgett, Child of Silence

Short story award
Winner:
Susan Dunlap, "Checkout", from Malice Domestic 2

Shortlist:
K.K. Beck, "A Romance in the Rockies", from Malice Domestic 2
M.D. Lake, "Kim's Game", from Malice Domestic 2
Robert Lopresti, "Crow's Feat", from Constable New Crimes 2

Critical / Non-fiction award
Winner:
Ed Gorman, Martin H. Greenberg, Larry Segriff & Jon L. Breen, The Fine Art of Murder: The Mystery Reader's Indispensable Companion

Shortlist:
Burl Barer, The Saint: A Complete History in Print, Radio, Television, and Film
Marvin Lachman, A Reader's Guide to the American Novel of Detection
Gary Warren Niebuhr, A Reader's Guide to the Private Eye Novel
Barbara Reynolds, Dorothy L Sayers; Her Life and Soul

True crime award
Winner:
Ann Rule, A Rose for Her Grave and Other True Cases

Shortlist:
Gary C. King, Driven to Kill: Westley Allan Dodd
Jack Olsen, The Misbegotten Son: A Serial Killer and His Victims: The true story of Arthur J. Shawcross
Bella Stumbo, Until the Twelfth of Never: The Deadly Divorce of Dan & Betty Broderick

Short story collection / anthology award
Winner:
Martin H. Greenberg, Mary Higgins Clark Presents Malice Domestic 2

Shortlist:
Lawrence Block, Some Days You Get the Bear
Joseph Hansen, Bohannon's Country
Ed Hoch, The Year's Best Mystery and Suspense Stories-1993
Marcia Muller, Ed Gorman & Bill Pronzini, Criminal Intent 1

References

External links

Anthony Awards
25
October 1994 events in the United States
1994 in Seattle
1994 in literature